Shalu Monastery is small monastery  south of Shigatse in Tibet. Founded in 1040 by Chetsun Sherab Jungnay, for centuries it was renowned as a centre of scholarly learning and psychic training and its mural paintings were considered to be the most ancient and beautiful in Tibet. Shalu was the first of the major monasteries to be built by noble families of the Tsangpa during Tibet's great revival of Buddhism, and was an important center of the Sakya tradition.

Repair and reconstruction
Repair and reconstruction of Shalu Monastery began on May 13, 2009, according to the Chinese government Xinhua online news. "The project, one of Tibet's biggest heritage renovation projects under the 11th Five Year Plan (2006–2010), involves reinforcement of its buildings, maintenance of sewage treatment facilities and improvement of fire and flood control systems", a prefectural government official said. It is planned to spend more than 16 million RMB yuan on the project.

Further reading
 Vitali, Roberto. 1990. Early Temples of Central Tibet. Serindia Publications. London. . Chapter Four: "Shalu Serkhang and the Newar Style of the Yüan Court." Pages 89–122.
 von Schroeder, Ulrich. 2001. Buddhist Sculptures in Tibet. Vol. One: India & Nepal; Vol. Two: Tibet & China. (Volume One: 655 pages with 766 illustrations; Volume Two: 675 pages with 987 illustrations). Hong Kong: Visual Dharma Publications, Ltd. . Zhwa lu («shalu») monastery, pp. 554, 922, 925, 1085, 1088, 1129: Zhwa lu gSer khang («shalu serkhang»), 554, 842, 922, 925; Figs. XIV–14–16, XV–8. Jo khang («jokhang»), p. 922; Pls. 47C, 229A, 230C, 231B, 231D, 314A, 329E. gNyer khang byang («nyerkhang chang»); Pls. 268C–D, 301A, 313A, 324E. gTsug la g khang («tsuglakhang»); Pl. 292A. Yum chen mo lha khang («yum chenmo lhakhang»), pp. 842–843; Figs. XIII–14–16. gZhal yas lha khang byang («shalye lhakhang chang»), pp. 439, 441, 913, 922; Figs. VII–3–4, XV–2; Pls. 169A, 169B, 229B, 229C, 230A, 230B, 231A, 231E, 322B. gZhal yas lha khang lho («shalye lhakhang lho»), pp. 922, 1129; Pls. 232B–C, 233B–C, 234B, 252D–F, 315A, 315B, 315C, 315D, 315E, 318D, 318E.

Notes

External links

Shalu Monastery - The Shalu Association

Buddhist monasteries in Tibet
Buddhist temples in Tibet
Sakya monasteries and temples
1040 establishments in Asia
Religious organizations established in the 11th century
Major National Historical and Cultural Sites in Tibet
11th-century Buddhist temples
Religious buildings and structures completed in 1040